Broadwas, or Broadwas-on-Teme, is a village and civil parish (with  Cotheridge) in the Malvern Hills district of Worcestershire, England.  According to the 2001 census it had a population of 307.  The village is located on the River Teme, about 6 miles west of Worcester on the A44 road.

Off the main road near the River Teme is the red sandstone church of St Mary Magdelene.

History

Following the Poor Law Amendment Act 1834 Broadwas Parish ceased to be responsible for maintaining the poor in its parish. This responsibility was transferred to Martley Poor Law Union.

References

External links

 Broadwas web site

Villages in Worcestershire
Civil parishes in Worcestershire